Pterolophia riouensis is a species of beetle in the family Cerambycidae. It was described by Stephan von Breuning in 1938. It is endemic to Borneo.

References

riouensis
Beetles described in 1938
Endemic fauna of Borneo
Taxa named by Stephan von Breuning (entomologist)